MRM, mrm, or variation, may refer to:

Places
Mad River Mountain, a ski resort in western Ohio, United States
Manari Airport (IATA airport code: MRM), an airport in Manari, Papua New Guinea
Marymount MRT station (MRT station abbreviation), Singapore
McArthur River mine (disambiguation), multiple locations

Activism
Magyar Remény Mozgalom, a Hungarian political movement
Maldives Reform Movement
Men's rights movement, a social and political movement concerned with the legal and societal rights of men, primarily in Western cultures and India

Management
Maintenance Resource Management, a human-error reduction strategy in aviation maintenance operations
Maritime Resource Management, a human factors training programme aimed at the maritime industry
Masters of Resource Management, a degree conferred by the School of Resource and Environmental Management at Simon Fraser University in Burnaby, British Columbia, Canada

Science
Magnetic Resonance in Medicine, an academic journal
Magnetic Resonance Microscopy, a magnetic resonance imaging technique at a microscopic level
Mini-Research Module (disambiguation) (MRM-1 and MRM-2), two Russian-built labs on the International Space Station
Minsky register machine, a type of abstract computing device propounded by Marvin Minsky
Minterm-ring map, a variant of Karnaugh maps by Thomas R. McCalla in logic minimization
Multiple reaction monitoring, a method for targeted quantitative mass spectrometry
Multiple reciprocity method, a method similar to the boundary particle method

Other
MRM or McCann Relationship Marketing, a global Internet professional services company
Mechanically recovered meat, a paste/batter-like meat product
Merlav language (ISO 639-3 code: mrm)
Metered reply mail, a self-addressed envelopes or postcards with postage prepaid with a postage meter
Monticello Railway Museum, a museum in Monticello, Illinois, United States
Mountaintop removal mining
Team Milram (UCI team code), a German pro cycling team
XM1111 Mid-Range Munition

See also
 Mister M (disambiguation) (Mr M)